The 1996 Tyson Holly Farms 400 was the twenty-seventh stock car race of the 1996 NASCAR Winston Cup Series. It was held on September 29, 1996 at North Wilkesboro Speedway in Wilkes County, North Carolina. The 400-lap race was won by Jeff Gordon of the Hendrick Motorsports team after he started from second position. Dale Earnhardt finished second and Dale Jarrett came in third.

The victory was Gordon's tenth of the season, and the nineteenth of his career. It was also the last NASCAR race to be held at North Wilkesboro Speedway until the 2023 NASCAR All-Star Race.

Entry list

Report

Background
Before the race Jeff Gordon led the Drivers' Championship with 3,903 points, eighty-one ahead of Hendrick Motorsports teammate Terry Labonte in second, with Dale Jarrett a further eighty-one points adrift in third. Dale Earnhardt was fourth on 3,562, and Mark Martin was a further seventy-nine behind in fifth place. Martin was the race's defending champion.

It was announced shortly beforehand that the Tyson Holly Farms 400 would be the last NASCAR race held at North Wilkesboro Speedway after the track was sold to promoters Bruton Smith and Bob Bahre following the death of its previous owner Enoch Staley in 1995. North Wilkesboro's two races would be taken over by Smith's Texas Motor Speedway in the spring and Bahre's New Hampshire Motor Speedway in the fall starting from 1997 as part of a schedule realignment.

First Round Qualifying

First-round qualifying started at 3 p.m. on Friday. Bobby Hamilton, driving the popular #43 Petty Enterprises Pontiac, had the fastest run before rain interrupted qualifying with 13 of the 40 drivers still waiting to make their run. After a -hour delay qualifying resumed with Jeff Gordon,  the defending series champion, being the first driver to make a qualifying lap. Gordon put his #24 Chevrolet on top of the charts with a lap of 117.937 mph. Gordon's run held until Ted Musgrave, driving for Jack Roush in the #16 Family Channel/Primestar  Ford Thunderbird, won the pole with a lap of 118.054 mph. It was Musgrave's first pole of the season and the fifth and final pole of his career. Hamilton ended up 3rd, with defending race winner Mark Martin and Ernie Irvan filling out the top five starting spots.

Second Round Qualifying

With only the top 25 locked in times from the first round Qualifying the previous day, Second-round qualifying allowed drivers to stand on their first-round times or make a second attempt. 
Only 6 drivers made a second-round attempt on Saturday. Hut Stricklin was the fastest in second-round qualifying, and Dale Jarrett also improved on his first day's effort. Race provisionals went to Geoffrey Bodine, Lake Speed, Robert Pressley, and Jeff Green. Darrell Waltrip got the past champion's provisional. Three drivers, Ward Burton, Dick Trickle and Gary Bradberry, failed to qualify.

Final Practice

Rain cut final practice short for Cup teams. Jeff Gordon completed just 15 laps when his car developed engine problems, later found to be debris in the carburetor.

Race Day

More than 40,000 fans were in attendance to see the final Winston Cup Series race at North Wilkesboro on Sunday. Many fans carried signs with messages such as, "We'll miss you North Wilkesboro," or "Farewell Old Friend". ESPN provided television coverage of the race as it had since 1982. It was the 30th Winston Cup Series race broadcast from the track by ESPN.

Race

The race started at 1 P.M. on Sunday. From the 2nd starting spot, Jeff Gordon jumped out past pole sitter Ted Musgrave to lead the first few laps of the race. On lap 22 the first caution came out for debris on the track. Gordon had a dominant car throughout the race. An accident on the front-stretch between Ernie Irvan, Kyle Petty and Bobby Hamilton brought out the 2nd caution on lap 72. At halfway, Gordon lead and collected the $10,000 halfway leader bonus. Another caution came out on lap 261 for oil on the track. Robert Pressley's accident in turn 3 brought out the final caution on lap 315. With 79 laps to go, Gordon moved past Dale Earnhardt on a restart and took the lead for the final time. Gordon would win the race by 1.73 seconds over Earnhardt. Dale Jarrett, Jeff Burton and Terry Labonte rounded out the top five. It was Gordon's 10th win of the season and third win in a row after victories at Dover and Martinsville. The highest-finishing rookie, Johnny Benson, finishing 17th. Pole sitter Ted Musgrave failed to lead a lap and ended up finished 19th in the 37-car field. The race featured 18 Lead changes between 8 different drivers throughout the day with Gordon leading a race-high 207 laps. Every car that started the race was running at the finish.

Race results

Race statistics
 Time of race: 2:34:54 
 Average Speed: 96.837 mph
 Pole Speed: 118.054 mph
 Cautions: 4 Cautions for 29 laps
 Margin of Victory: 1.73 seconds
 Lead changes: 18 between 8 drivers
 Percent of race run under caution:  7.25%       
 Average green flag run: 74.2 Laps

Post-race
The results meant Gordon extended his lead in the Drivers' Championship, ahead of Labonte and Jarrett. Earnhardt and Martin rounded out the top five positions. The race took two hours. thirty-four minutes and fifty-four seconds to complete, and the margin of victory was 1.73 seconds.

References

Tyson Holly Farms 400
Tyson Holly Farms 400
NASCAR races at North Wilkesboro Speedway
September 1996 sports events in the United States